The GPD Win Max is a Windows-based palmtop computer manufactured by Gamepad Digital (GPD). It is the successor to the GPD Win 2, and was crowdfunded, like its predecessor. Announced in the first quarter of 2020, the crowdfunding campaign was launched on Indiegogo on May 18, 2020, priced at $779. The campaign concluded on July 1, 2020 with more than 3,500 backers having contributed more than $2.8 million dollars in total.

The GPD Win Max is rated to run AAA video game titles and emulate consoles from the sixth generation and earlier, with some support for consoles up to the eighth generation.

History 
Following the GPD Win 2 in 2018, and the larger GPD Pocket 2 in 2019, GPD announced their largest device yet as the GPD Win Max. This device is the size of a Netbook, and retains GPD's signature embedded controller. The Win Max was leaked and received media coverage as early as April 2019, with conclusive coverage coming in April, 2020.

After the conclusion of the Indiegogo campaign on July 1, 2020 the price of the Win max rose from $779 to $800 while remaining on sale via Indemand until July 15.

Specification

Design 
With the Win Max being GPD's largest gaming device as of release, there was room for additions such a scissor switch keyboard which would support touch typing, similar to what is available on their GPD Pocket Range, as well as a touchpad, and an 8" screen. This unit also introduces GPD's first instance of clickable analog sticks, one of which has been moved inside the ABXY buttons, as well as buttons with a very similar style to the PlayStation Vita (with a layout and markings similar to the Xbox). The Win Max speakers have been moved underneath the unit towards the user. Access to the M.2 drive has been reduced, as the unit must be disassembled to change this drive. An ethernet port has been added to the right side of the device, which would prevent a user from effectively holding the console while this port is in use.

This increase in size has also allowed an increase in cooling potential of the Max with dual fans and Heat pipes.

Otherwise, the Win Max maintains a similar design to previous units with a milled magnesium aluminum alloy chassis and an ABS plastic shell. With the far side of the device providing access to two USB-A ports, four shoulder buttons, a USB-C port as well as a Thunderbolt 3 port, and a small reset button. The back panel also includes another change: the win series' first full-size HDMI port.

Performance

Release and Reception 
Win Max units started shipping to Indiegogo backers on August 17, 2020. Some users have reported failure of the included USB-C power supply.

See also 

 Comparison of handheld game consoles
 GPD Win
 GPD Win 2
GPD Win 3
 GPD XD
 PC gaming
 Handheld game console

References 

Handheld personal computers
Indiegogo projects